Marina Viktorovna Belikova (born November 24, 1985 in Rostov-on-Don) is a Russian sport shooter. She won a silver medal in the women's skeet at the 2011 European Shooting Championships in Belgrade, Serbia, accumulating a score of 96 targets. Belikova is also a member of the Russian Shooting Union, and is coached and trained by Oleg Tishin.

Belikova represented Russia at the 2012 Summer Olympics in London, where she competed in the women's skeet. She had finished on exactly the same score of 90 targets (69 in the preliminary rounds and 21 in the final) as Slovakia's Danka Barteková, but narrowly lost the bronze medal shoot-off by one point for a bonus of three.

References

External links
NBC Olympics Profile

1985 births
Living people
Russian female sport shooters
Skeet shooters
Olympic shooters of Russia
Shooters at the 2012 Summer Olympics
Sportspeople from Rostov-on-Don
21st-century Russian women